Let the Good Times Roll may refer to:

"Let the Good Times Roll" (Shirley and Lee song), a 1956 song by Shirley and Lee
"Let the Good Times Roll" (Louis Jordan song), a 1946 song by Louis Jordan and his Tympany Five
Let the Good Times Roll (album), a 1999 album by B.B. King
"Let the Good Times Roll/Feel So Fine", a 1972 song by British band Slade which, along other tracks, have been covered by multiple bands, e.g. Twisted Sister
"Good Times Roll", 1978 song by The Cars
"Good Times Roll", a parody of "Lucy in the Sky with Diamonds" from The Rutles soundtrack
"Good Times" (Sam Cooke song), also known as "Let the Good Times Roll"
"Come On" (Earl King song), also known as "Come On (Let the Good Times Roll)", covered by The Jimi Hendrix Experience
Let the Good Times Roll (film), a 1973 film featuring Bill Haley and the Comets, Chuck Berry and others
"Let the Good Times Roll", a two-song single by Swedish indie pop band My darling YOU!
Let the Good Times Roll, a caramel corn-scented face and body cleanser made by LUSH Cosmetics.

See also
Laissez les bons temps rouler